Topological geometry deals with incidence structures consisting of a point set  and a family  of subsets of  called lines or circles etc. such that both  and  carry a topology and all geometric operations like joining points by a line or intersecting lines are continuous. As in the case of topological groups, many deeper results require the point space to be (locally) compact and connected. This generalizes the observation that the line joining two distinct points in the Euclidean plane depends continuously on the pair of points and the intersection point of two lines is a continuous function of these lines.

Linear geometries 
Such geometries are called topological if  depends continuously on the pair  with respect to given topologies on the point set and the line set. The dual of a linear geometry is obtained by interchanging the roles of points and lines. A survey of linear topological geometries is given in Chapter 23 of the Handbook of incidence geometry. The most extensively investigated topological linear geometries are those which are also dual topological linear geometries. Such geometries are known as topological projective planes.

History
A systematic study of these planes began in 1954 with a paper by Skornyakov. Earlier, the topological properties of the real plane had been introduced via ordering relations on the affine lines, see, e.g., Hilbert, Coxeter, and O. Wyler. Note that the rational numbers do not suffice to describe our intuitive notions of plane geometry and that some extension of the rational field is necessary. In fact, the equation  for a circle has no rational solution.

Topological projective planes
The approach to the topological properties of projective planes via ordering relations is not possible, however, for the planes coordinatized by the complex numbers, the quaternions or the octonion algebra. The point spaces as well as the line spaces of these classical planes (over the real numbers, the complex numbers, the quaternions, and the octonions) are compact manifolds of dimension .

Topological dimension
The notion of the dimension of a topological space plays a prominent rôle in the study of topological, in particular of compact connected planes. For a normal space , the dimension  can be characterized as follows:

If  denotes the -sphere, then  if, and only if, for every closed subspace  each continuous map  has a continuous extension .

For details and other definitions of a dimension see  and the references given there, in particular Engelking or Fedorchuk.

2-dimensional planes
The lines of a compact topological plane with a 2-dimensional point space form a family of curves homeomorphic to a circle, and this fact characterizes these planes among the topological projective planes. Equivalently, the point space is a surface. Early examples not isomorphic to the classical real plane  have been given by Hilbert and Moulton. The continuity properties of these examples have not been considered explicitly at that time, they may have been taken for granted. Hilbert’s construction can be modified to obtain uncountably many pairwise non-isomorphic -dimensional compact planes. The traditional way to distinguish  from the other -dimensional planes is by the validity of Desargues’s theorem or the theorem of Pappos (see, e.g., Pickert for a discussion of these two configuration theorems). The latter is known to imply the former (Hessenberg). The theorem of Desargues expresses a kind of homogeneity of the plane. In general, it holds in a projective plane if, and only if, the plane can be coordinatized by a (not necessarily commutative) field, hence it implies that the group of automorphisms is transitive on the set of quadrangles ( points no  of which are collinear). In the present setting, a much weaker homogeneity condition characterizes :

Theorem.

The automorphism group  of a -dimensional compact plane , taken with the topology of uniform convergence on the point space, is a locally compact group of dimension at most , in fact even a Lie group.

Compact connected planes 
The results on -dimensional planes have been extended to compact planes of dimension . This is possible due to the following basic theorem:

Topology of compact planes. Moreover, each line is a homotopy sphere of dimension , see  or.

Special aspects of 4-dimensional planes are treated in, more recent results can be found in. The lines of a -dimensional compact plane are homeomorphic to the -sphere; in the cases  the lines are not known to be manifolds, but in all examples which have been found so far the lines are spheres. Hence the lines of an 8-dimensional plane  are homeomorphic to a sphere  if  has a closed Baer subplane.

Homogeneous planes. In fact,  is an elliptic motion group.

Let  be a compact plane of dimension , and write . Vast families of planes with a group of large dimension have been discovered systematically starting from assumptions about their automorphism groups, see, e.g.,.

Compact projective spaces 
Subplanes of projective spaces of geometrical dimension at least 3 are necessarily Desarguesian, see  §1 or  §16 or. Therefore, all compact connected projective spaces can be coordinatized by the real or complex numbers or the quaternion field.

Stable planes
The classical non-euclidean hyperbolic plane can be represented by the intersections of the straight lines in the real plane with an open circular disk. More generally, open (convex) parts of the classical affine planes are typical stable planes. A survey of these geometries can be found in, for the -dimensional case see also.

Precisely, a stable plane  is a topological linear geometry  such that

  is a locally compact space of positive finite dimension,
 the set  is an open subspace  ( stability),
 the map  is continuous.

A stable plane  is a projective plane if, and only if,  is compact.

Moreover, the point space  is locally contractible.

Compact groups of (proper) stable planes
are rather small. Let  denote a maximal compact subgroup of the automorphism group of the classical -dimensional projective plane . Then the following theorem holds:
If a -dimensional stable plane  admits a compact group  of automorphisms such that , then , see.Flag-homogeneous stable planes.' Let  be a stable plane.

In contrast to the projective case, there is an abundance of point-homogeneous stable planes, among them vast classes of translation planes, see  and.

Symmetric planes
Affine translation planes have the following property:

 There exists a point transitive closed subgroup  of the automorphism group which contains a unique reflection at some and hence at each point.

More generally, a symmetric plane is a stable plane  satisfying the aforementioned condition; see, cf. for a survey of these geometries. By  Corollary 5.5, the group  is a Lie group and the point space  is a manifold. It follows that  is a symmetric space. By means of the Lie theory of symmetric spaces, all symmetric planes with a point set of dimension  or  have been classified. They are either translation planes or they are determined by a Hermitian form. An easy example is the real hyperbolic plane.

Circle geometries 
Classical models  are given by the plane sections of a quadratic surface  in real projective -space; if  is a sphere, the geometry is called a Möbius plane. The plane sections of a ruled surface (one-sheeted hyperboloid) yield the classical Minkowski plane, cf. for generalizations. If  is an elliptic cone without its vertex, the geometry is called a Laguerre plane. Collectively these planes are sometimes referred to as Benz planes. A topological Benz plane is classical, if each point has a neighbourhood which is isomorphic to some open piece of the corresponding classical Benz plane.

Möbius planes
Möbius planes consist of a family  of circles, which are topological 1-spheres, on the -sphere  such that for each point  the derived structure  is a topological affine plane. In particular, any  distinct points are joined by a unique circle. The circle space  is then homeomorphic to real projective -space with one point deleted. A large class of examples is given by the plane sections of an egg-like surface in real -space.

In contrast to compact projective planes there are no topological Möbius planes with circles of dimension , in particular no compact Möbius planes with a -dimensional point space. All 2-dimensional Möbius planes such that  can be described explicitly.

Laguerre planes 
Pairs of points which are not joined by a circle are called parallel. Let  denote a class of parallel points. Then  is a plane , the circles can be represented in this plane by parabolas of the form .

In an analogous way, the classical -dimensional Laguerre plane is related to the geometry of complex quadratic polynomials. In general, the axioms of a locally compact connected Laguerre plane require that the derived planes embed into compact projective planes of finite dimension. A circle not passing through the point of derivation induces an oval in the derived projective plane. Hence the point space of a locally compact connected Laguerre plane is homeomorphic to the cylinder  or it is a -dimensional manifold, cf.

The automorphism group of a -dimensional Laguerre plane is a Lie group with respect to the topology of uniform convergence on compact subsets of the point space; furthermore, this group has dimension at most . All automorphisms of a Laguerre plane which fix each parallel class form a normal subgroup, the kernel of the full automorphism group. The classical -dimensional Laguerre planes are the only ones such that , see, cf. also.

 Homogeneous Laguerre planes If the automorphism group  of a -dimensional Laguerre plane  is transitive on the set of parallel classes, and if the kernel  is transitive on the set of circles, then  is classical, see  2.1,2.

However, transitivity of the automorphism group on the set of circles does not suffice to characterize the classical model among the -dimensional Laguerre planes.

Minkowski planes 

Homogeneous Minkowski planesIf the automorphism group  of a Minkowski plane  of dimension  is flag-transitive, then  is classical''.

The automorphism group of a -dimensional Minkowski plane is a Lie group of dimension at most . All -dimensional Minkowski planes such that  can be described explicitly.

Notes

References 
 
 
 
 
 
 
 
 
 
 
 

Topology
Incidence geometry